The 2011 Singapore Cup (known as the RHB Singapore Cup for sponsorship reasons) starts in June 2011. It is the 14th staging of the annual Singapore Cup tournament.

11 S.League clubs and 5 invited foreign teams play in this edition. The cup was a single-elimination tournament, with all sixteen teams playing from the first round. The first round involved one-off matches. Subsequent rounds involved ties of two legs.

The Young Lions have opted out of participation in view of their involvement in the inaugural AFF Under-23 tournament in Indonesia during the period of the competition.

Unlike previous editions, this season does not apply the away goals rule which explains despite SAFFC scored 2 away goals in the second leg during the quarter finals against Albirex Niigata (S) that ends a 2–2 draw with its first leg held to a goalless draw stalemate, the game continues to the extra time and subsequently to penalty shootout after the deadlock was not break whereby Albirex Niigata (S) won the penalty shootout again and advances to the Semi-Finals. The same thing had also happened to Home United where they advanced through Semi-Finals by penalties after the first leg where Home United scored a 3 away goals for a 3–3 draw while scoring no goals from either side on the second leg.

The first round kicked off in June with the final to be played on 5 November.

The cup winner were guaranteed a place in the 2012 AFC Cup.

Teams
S.League Clubs
  Albirex Niigata (S)
 Balestier Khalsa
  Etoile
 Geylang United
 Gombak United
 Home United
 Hougang United
 Singapore Armed Forces (SAFFC)
 Tampines Rovers
 Tanjong Pagar United
 Woodlands Wellington

Invited Foreign Teams
  South Melbourne
  Pattaya United
  Phnom Penh Crown
  Okktha United
  Harimau Muda B*

* The original team to participate was Harimau Muda A, But later replaced by Harimau Muda B.

Knockout bracket

Preliminary round

Quarter-finals

1st Leg

2nd Leg

Semi-finals

1st Leg

2nd Leg

Third-place Playoff

Final

Winners

References

External links
 Official S.League website
 Football Association of Singapore website

2011
2011 domestic association football cups
Cup